Rehn is a Scandinavian and German surname, also used in Finland.

Geographical distribution
As of 2014, 32.3% of all known bearers of the surname Rehn were residents of Germany (frequency 1:32,130), 25.7% of Sweden (1:4,951), 18.9% of the United States (1:247,942), 7.7% of Finland (1:9,223), 3.6% of Australia (1:84,605), 2.9% of Brazil (1:925,395), 2.1% of Canada (1:227,148), 1.6% of Iraq (1:277,950) and 1.0% of Austria (1:110,576).

In Sweden, the frequency of the surname was higher than national average (1:4,951) in the following counties:
 1. Jönköping County (1:2,150)
 2. Västerbotten County (1:2,340)
 3. Östergötland County (1:2,445)
 4. Blekinge County (1:3,499)
 5. Gävleborg County (1:3,590)
 6. Dalarna County (1:3,781)
 7. Kalmar County (1:4,727)
 8. Örebro County (1:4,834)
 9. Uppsala County (1:4,858)

In Finland, the frequency of the surname was higher than national average (1:9,223) in the following regions:
 1. Åland (1:1,292)
 2. Uusimaa (1:4,520)
 3. Southwest Finland (1:4,750)
 4. Päijänne Tavastia (1:7,220)
 5. Southern Savonia (1:7,948)

In Germany, the frequency of the surname was higher than national average (1:32,130) in the following states:
 1. Saxony (1:5,539)
 2. Rhineland-Palatinate (1:11,734)
 3. Hesse (1:19,037)
 4. Hamburg (1:21,791)
 5. Schleswig-Holstein (1:27,226)

People
 Elisabeth Rehn, Finnish politician, the country's first female Minister of Defence
 Frank Knox Morton Rehn, American artist
 James Abram Garfield Rehn, American entomologist
 Olli Rehn, Finnish politician, European Commissioner for Economic and Monetary Affairs and the euro
 Stefan Rehn, Swedish football player and manager
 Trista Rehn, Trista Nicole Sutter (née Rehn), the first Bachelorette
 Victor Rehn, physicist, former Director Office of Naval Research, Asia-Pacific.
 Vuokko Rehn (1938—2011), Finnish politician
Walter Richard Rehn (1884–1951), German painter

See also 
 Reen
 Rehm
 Rahn (disambiguation)
 Rähn

References

Swedish-language surnames
Surnames of Finnish origin
German-language surnames